Suqian is a prefecture-level city in northern Jiangsu Province, China. It borders Xuzhou to the northwest, Lianyungang to the northeast, Huai'an to the south, and the province of Anhui to the west.

History 

Suqian was said to be the site of a military grain store built when the Emperor Yuan of Jin reigned. Thus, the former Xiaxiang county where the store located was renamed Suyu (means "prepared" or "usually prepared") in 405. Then the county was annexed by Xuzhou and renamed Suqian in 762 because the homophone "yu" as the given name of the Emperor Daizong of Tang was deemed to be ineffable. The county was put under the jurisdiction of Huaiyang military prefecture during the Song dynasty, then was transferred to Pizhou after Jurchen's Jin took it. The county was administered by Huai'an military prefecture during 1272–75, but restored as a part of Pizhou afterwards. It was annexed by Xuzhou again in 1733.

The area was rife with banditry during the early years of the Republic of China. In Autumn 1917, six persons were executed as bandits in Suqian. "They cut off their arms, broke their legs, cut off their ears, punched out their eyes, skinned them, then cut off their heads, and finally cut out their hearts." Suqian was put under the jurisdiction of Huaiyin in 1934. The county was converted as a county-level city in 1987, later was  elevated to prefecture status in 1996.

Geography and climate
Suqian possesses the majority of Luoma Lake, which is a major lake in the Huai River basin.

Demographics 
As of the 2020 Chinese census, Suqian had a recorded population of about 4,986,192 whom 1,622,912 lived in the built-up (or metro) area made of Sucheng and Suyu urban districts.

Economy 
Local Yanghe along with Moutai and Wuliangye, are the three biggest manufacturers of baijiu. Besides, several domestic companies followed JD.com to site their call centres in Suqian.

Transport

Roads

Expressways 
G2513 Huai'an–Xuzhou Expressway

Rail 
Yanghe Station, known as Suqian Station on Suqian–Huai'an Railway is located in the south outskirt of Suqian.

Education 
Suqian College is the single institution in Suqian providing bachelor's degree education.

Administration

The prefecture-level city of Suqian administers 5 county-level divisions, including 3 counties and 2 districts.

These are further divided into 115 township-level divisions, including 111 towns and township, and 4 subdistricts.

References

External links
Government Website of Suqian (in Simplified Chinese)
Suqian comprehensive guide with open directory (Jiangsu.NET)

 
Cities in Jiangsu
Prefecture-level divisions of Jiangsu